Li Keqiang index or Keqiang index is an economic measurement index created by The Economist to measure China's economy using three indicators, as reportedly preferred by Li Keqiang, formerly the Premier of the People's Republic of China, as better economic indicator than official numbers of GDP.

According to a State Department memo (released by WikiLeaks), Li Keqiang (then the Chinese Communist Party Committee Secretary of Liaoning) told a US ambassador in 2007 that the GDP figures in Liaoning were unreliable and that he himself used three other indicators: the railway cargo volume, electricity consumption and loans disbursed by banks.

The "Keqiang index" is also used by Haitong Securities released in 2013, suggesting decelerating China's economic growth since the beginning of 2013.

See also 

 Economy of China
 Li Keqiang Government

References 

Macroeconomic indicators
Li Keqiang
Economy of China